Cornwell Farm is a historic home located in Great Falls, Fairfax County, Virginia.  It was built in 1831, and is a two-story, five-bay brick dwelling with a hipped roof in the Georgian style.  It has a -story addition connected by a gambrel roofed hyphen built in 1936–1937.

The house was constructed by John Jackson for his daughter, Julia Jackson Davis, when the farm was called Mine Ridge. After a period when it was named Fairview, it was eventually known as Cornwell Farm after owner B.F. Cornwell. Following a period of abandonment, it was restored by Robert Thompson Pell from 1936, who expanded the house. Additions were designed by architect Theodore W. Dominick.

The house was later owned by Louisiana congressman Jerry Huckaby and his wife Suzanna. The property is the subject of an effort to purchase and preserve it, to avoid possible demolition and construction of a six-house subdivision.
Cornwell Farm was listed on the National Register of Historic Places in 1977.

References

Houses on the National Register of Historic Places in Virginia
Georgian architecture in Virginia
Houses completed in 1831
Houses in Fairfax County, Virginia
National Register of Historic Places in Fairfax County, Virginia